Secondary suites (also known as accessory dwelling units, ADUs, in-law apartments, granny flats, and garden suites) are self-contained apartments, cottages, or small residential units, that are located on a property that has a separate main, single-family home, duplex, or other residential unit. In some cases, the ADU or in-law is attached to the principal dwelling or is an entirely separate unit, located above a garage or in the backyard on the same property. In British English the term annex or granny annex is used instead. Reasons for wanting to add a secondary suite to a property may be to receive additional income, provide social and personal support to a family member, or obtain greater security.

Description

Background
Naming conventions vary by time-period and location but secondary suites can also be referred to as an accessory dwelling unit (ADU), mother-in-law suite, granny flat, coach house, laneway house, Ohana dwelling unit, granny annexe, granny suite, in-law suite, and accessory apartment. The prevalence of secondary suites is also dependent on time and location with varying rates depending on the country, state, or city. Furthermore, regulations on secondary suites can vary widely in different jurisdictions with some allowing them with limited regulation while others ban them entirely through zoning, limit who may live in the units (for example, family members only), or regulate if units can be rented. In recent years, there has been a rise in the popularity of these units as a source of additional, passive income, or as a multigenerational living option.

Relationship to main residence

A secondary suite is considered "secondary" or "accessory" to the primary residence on the parcel. It normally has its own entrance, kitchen, bathroom and living area. There are three types of accessory units: interior, interior with modification, and detached. Examples of these accessory units include:

 A suite above a rear detached garage (a "garage apartment, garage suite, coachhouse, or Fonzie flat"),
 A suite above the main floor of a single-detached dwelling, (an "up-and-down duplex")
 A suite below the main floor of a single-detached dwelling (a "basement suite").
 A suite attached to a single-detached dwelling at grade (similar to a "duplex" but that word implies two distinct legal parcel of land with houses that simply share a wall)
 A suite detached from the principal dwelling (a "garden suite" or "guesthouse", called a "laneway house" if it faces the back lane).
 A granny flat, granny annex, mother-in-law cottage and the like are generic names for an ADU.

Benefits and drawbacks
Communities that support secondary suites may do so to support a diverse set of goals. Commonly cited benefits of secondary suites include the following;.

Benefits
 Creating more affordable housing options as secondary suites are typically small, easy to construct, increase housing supply, and require no land acquisition.
 Enabling seniors to "age-in-place" by creating smaller more affordable units where seniors can downsize in their own neighborhood. Some of the recent popularity of secondary suites in the United States can be attributed to the activism of the American Association of Retired Persons (AARP) and other organizations that support seniors.
 Supporting diverse and multi-generational households as seniors, young-adults, or other relatives can live on the same property as their families but still maintain some independence and privacy. For seniors, this kind of arrangement can improve their social life, allow family members to easily provide care, and allow them to live in more walkable neighborhoods when they can no longer drive.
 Improve home maintenance and homeownership rates by providing a reliable rental income that can support mortgage payments or home maintenance.
 Creating energy-efficient housing as the small and often attached units require fewer resources.
 ADUs can be integrated into the scale and character of single-family neighborhoods while also promoting workforce housing in these neighborhoods.
 Municipal budgets may benefit from new taxable housing that does not require new or significant utility upgrades, road maintenance, etc.

Drawbacks
Properties which are linked in complex ways may cause difficulties should one of the units be sold or rented out to a third party. Should this occur, each party requires permission from the other party to make certain types of changes to the building. When one unit is sold off to a third party, or is rented out, it can be difficult to attain a sale of a unit or of the whole building as one party may be reluctant to move out or sell.

By country

Australia
In Australia, the term 'granny flat' is often used for a secondary dwelling on a property. The land is not subdivided with construction requiring approval from the council or relevant authority. The approval processes vary between States and Territories, and between councils. This is different from a dual occupancy, where two primary dwellings are developed on one allotment of land, being either attached, semi-detached or detached. In 2018, New South Wales led the construction of new granny flats while Victoria had the fewest number of new granny flats constructed.  In 2019, the federal government launched a study concerning prefabricated buildings and smaller homes citing affordable housing, extra space for family members, and support for the construction industry as reasons for the study. The government set aside $2 million for the initial study and then plans to set up an innovation lab to help manufacturers design prefabricated buildings.

Canada

Secondary suites have existed in Canada since the 19th century where they took the form of coach houses, servant houses, stables converted to permanent apartments, and small apartments for young people within large houses. Secondary suites became increasing popular during the economic crisis of 1929 and the housing shortage following WWII. During this period the Canadian government actively supported the creation of secondary suites. However, suburbanization and zoning changes in the 1950s and 60s led to a decrease in secondary suites in Canada. More recently, secondary suites are increasing in popularity and many municipalities are reexamining their regulations to support secondary suites.

CMHC (Government program)
The Canada Mortgage and Housing Corporation provides a financial assistance program to help Canadians create affordable housing for low-income seniors and adults with a disability within a secondary suite. The program is called the Residential Rehabilitation Assistance Program (RRAP) -- Secondary/Garden Suite. The maximum fully forgivable loan depends on the location of the property:
 Southern Areas of Canada: $24,000/unit
 Northern areas of Canada: $28,000/unit
 Far northern areas: $36,000/unit
A 25% supplement in assistance is available in remote areas.

British Columbia
After adopting legislation in 2009 to support secondary suites, Vancouver, British Columbia has become a leading city of their construction in North America.  In the city, approximately a third of single-family houses have legally permitted secondary suites, many of which are laneway houses. The Housing Policy Branch of British Columbia's Ministry of Community, Aboriginal and Women’s Services published a guide for local governments to implement secondary suite programs called 'Secondary Suites: A Guide For Local Governments'. The current issue is dated September 2005. The intent of the guide is to "help local governments develop and implement secondary suite programs". It also highlights good secondary suite practices as well as providing practical information to "elected officials, planners, community groups, homeowners, developers, and others interested in secondary suites".

Europe 
In German speaking countries a secondary suite is known as an Einliegerwohnung. In Norway, particularly in the bigger cities, it is quite common to build separate adjoined smaller flats for renting out. The owner of the main flat will rent out the smaller adjoined flats. In the United Kingdom, "granny flats" are increasing in popularity with one in twenty UK households (5%) having such a space already. Furthermore, 7% of householders say they have plans to develop this type of space in the future. Stated reasons for constructing these spaces was diverse with 27% of those surveyed making plans for older relatives, 25% planning for grown-up children, 24% planning to rent as holiday lets, and 16% planning to take in lodgers. In Sweden, a friggebod is a small house or room which can be built without any planning permission on a land lot with a single-family or a duplex house.

United States

In the United States, secondary suites are generally referred to as accessory dwelling units or "ADUs". Zoning permissions and laws concerning accessory dwelling units can vary widely by state and municipality. Accessory dwelling units were popular in the early 20th century in the United States. ADUs became less common after WWII, however, when a shift to suburban development occurred and many municipalities banned ADUs through zoning regulations. With increases in the price of housing in many cities and suburbs, increased awareness of the costs of low-density car-oriented development patterns, and an increased need to care for aging Americans, many government entities and advocacy groups have increasingly supported ADUs. Some critics perceive ADUs to be a threat to the character of single-family residential neighborhoods.

Several states have enacted legislation to promote accessory dwelling units. In California, Government Code Sections 65852.150, 65852.2 & 65852.22 pertain to local regulation of ADUs. SB 1069 and AB 2299 are California bills approved in 2016 and effective January 1, 2017, that limit local government authority to prohibit ADUs in certain cases (and also reduce cost and bureaucracy hurdles to construction). On January 1, 2020, the state of California passed the most lenient ADU laws in the country allowing not one but two types of accessory units, the accessory dwelling unit (ADU) and the junior accessory dwelling unit (JADU). State-exempt ADUs can now be at least 800 square feet, while JADUs are limited to 550 square feet.
The states of Vermont and New Hampshire have also adopted a number of bills that promote accessory dwelling units and reduce regulatory barriers to ADU construction. The State of Illinois considered, but did not adopt, HB 4869 which would have required municipalities to permit (and reasonably regulate) accessory dwelling units (ADUs).

Several local governments across the United States have enacted ordinances to both permit and promote accessory dwelling units. Some cities have included accessory dwelling units in larger missing middle housing and affordable housing strategies including Seattle, Portland, and Minneapolis. Many other communities have maintained wide-spread single-family zoning but still updated codes to permit accessory dwelling units. Notable examples include large cities such as Los Angeles, CA and Chicago, IL. Diverse smaller jurisdictions that permit accessory dwelling units include Lexington, KY, Santa Cruz, CA, and the County of Maui in Hawaii.

Honolulu, Hawaii has a unique form of accessory dwelling units known as an "Ohana Dwelling Unit". Ohana Dwellings were created as a permitted use in the zoning code in 1981 as a way to encourage the private sector to create more housing units (without government subsidy), preserve green fields (open space) and ease housing affordability. In 2015, Honolulu amended its zoning code to allows ADUs as a sort of Ohana Dwelling, but with fewer restrictions. To prevent creating further complexities for existing Ohana Dwellings, some of which have been condominimized and owned separately from the main house, Ohana Dwellings remain a permitted use (with different requirements and benefits than ADUs) in the zoning code. ADUs are an important component of Honolulu's Affordable Housing Strategy.

See also
Garage apartment
Laneway house

References

For New South Wales, the two approval paths are available.
1. If the Frontage of the land is 12m or more, a CDC (Private certifier) is possible. If less, then it must go through a DA(Council).
2. If above condition is met, another important requirement is the land size. If your land size is 450sqm or over, we can do a CDC approval. If it is less than 450sqm, we have to lodge the secondary dwelling application through the council.

External links
Accessory Dwelling Units in Arvada, Colorado. (video)

Urban planning
House types